The Consistori del Gay Saber ("Consistory of the Gay Science") was a poetic academy founded at Toulouse in 1323 to revive and perpetuate the lyric poetry of the troubadours.

Also known as the Acadèmia dels Jòcs Florals or Académie des Jeux Floraux ("Academy of the Floral Games"), it is the most ancient literary institution of the Western world. It was founded in 1323 in Toulouse and later restored by Clémence Isaure as the Consistori del Gay Saber with the goal of encouraging Occitan poetry. The best verses were given prizes at the floral games in the form of different flowers, made of gold or silver, such as violets, rose hips, marigolds, amaranths or lilies. The Consistori eventually became gallicised. It was renewed by Louis XIV in 1694 and still exists today. The  has had such prestigious members as Ronsard, Marmontel, Chateaubriand, Voltaire, Alfred de Vigny, Victor Hugo and Frédéric Mistral.

Foundation
The Consistori was founded by seven literary men of the bourgeoisie, who composed a manifesto, in Old Occitan verse, pledging to award prizes to poetry in the troubadouresque style and emulating the language of classical period of the troubadours (roughly 1160–1220). In its efforts to promote an extinct literary koiné over the evolving dialects of the fourteenth century, the Consistori went a long way to preserving the troubadours' memory for posterity as well as bequeathing to later scholarship an encyclopaedic terminology for the analysis and historiography of Occitan lyric poetry. Chaytor believed that the Consistori "arose out of informal meetings of poets held in earlier years".

In 1390 John I of Aragon, one of the earliest Renaissance humanists to sit on a European throne, established the Consistori de Barcelona in imitation of the Toulousain academy.

Activities

The other prizes, awarded for particular poetic forms, were similarly floral, leading later scholars to label the competitions the Jocs Florals.

The first prize was awarded on 3 May 1324 to Arnaut Vidal de Castelnou d'Ari for a sirventes in praise of the Virgin Mary. The contests were held intermittently until 1484, when the last prize was awarded to Arnaut Bernart de Tarascon. From this period of 160 years survive the record of around a hundred prizes. During that century and a half, the Consistori saw participants from both south of the Pyrenees and north of Occitania, both men and women. In an unknown year, possibly 1385, an anonymous Catalan woman submitted a planh to the seven maintainers for judgement. The  (lament) is that of a faithful woman for her lover, who has been absent several years.

It was in order to judge these contests that the Consistori first commissioned an Occitan grammar, including the laws of poetry, be written up. The first compiler was Guilhem Molinier, whose Leys d'amor was completed between 1328 and 1337. It went through two subsequent redactions. Several other grammatical treatises and glosses were produced by poets associated with the Consistori.

By 1471 the Consistori was losing its Occitan character. It awarded the golden violet to Peire de Janilhac : notwithstanding that he was French, because he composed in the language of Toulouse. In 1513 the Consistori was transformed into the : the College of French Rhetoric and Poetry. In 1554 the College awarded a silver eglantine rose to none other than Pierre de Ronsard, the greatest French poet of his generation, for his . It still exists today.

Character and legacy

The Consistori, in its nostalgic attempt to preserve what had gone out of style, is often credited with fostering a monotonous form of poetry devoid of vibrance and feeling. Partly, however, this can be blamed on the Inquisition and the fear of being labelled immoral or, worse, a heretic. Courtly love, with all its adulterous and extramarital connotations, was a rarer theme with troubadours associated with Toulouse than religious themes, especially Marian. Even on religious themes, however, their work lacks the "force" of the last troubadours of the thirteenth century, like Cerverí de Girona, who wrote much on such themes. The Toulousains lacked originality and for that reason their accomplishments have been undervalued by later generations. Their isolation and their classicism cut them off from the literary movements giving life to other vernaculars, such as the dolce stil novo and the Renaissance in Italian and the work of Ausiàs March in Catalan.

Martí de Riquer is highly critical of the escòla poetica de Tolosa, which he charges with a thematically severely limited, weighed down by a narrow conception of art and imposing strictures governing poetic form and content, negatively influencing Catalan poetry by exporting occitanisms (until Italian trends wafted over the western Mediterranean sea routes to rejuvenate it), and sustaining an outmoded literary language. He compares it to French neoclassicism and its "tyranny of the monotonous alexandrine".

It is the inspiration for Friedrich Nietzsche's The Gay Science, 1882. It is the namesake of the Italian folk group Gai Saber.

Associated troubadours

Arnaut Bernart de Tarascon, won the violet in 1484
Arnaut Vidal de Castelnou d'Ari, won the violet in 1324
Bernart de Panassac, founding member
Bernat de Palaol, lost a debate with Rovira in 1386
Bertran del Falgar, "crowned" winner in unknown year
Bertran de Payna, "crowned" winner in unknown year
Bertran de Sant Roscha, "crowned" winner thrice
Gaston III of Foix, won the "joia" unknown year
Germà de Gontaut, maintainer in 1355 and 1386
Guilhem Molinier, first chancellor, wrote up the rules (Leys)
Guillem Bossatz d'Aorlayachs, won the eglantine and was "crowned"
Guillem Vetzinas, "sealed" winner in unknown year
Jacme Rovira, won a debate with Palaol in 1386
Jaume de Tolosa, "crowned" winner unknown year
Johan Blanch, won the violet c. 1360
Joan de Castellnou, completed the final version of the Leys around 1355
Lorenç Mallol, submitted a figured verse for competition
Luys Ycart, participant in unknown year
Peire Duran de Limoux, won the violet in 1373
Peire de Ladils, collaborator with Raimon de Cornet
Peire de Monlasur, collaborator with Peire Duran
Raimon de Cornet, called  (the most brilliant spirit) of the Consistori
Ramenat Montaut, won the "joia" unknown year
Ramon Galbarra, maintainer in 1355 and 1386

Notes

References

Bibliography

External links
 website
  Une fiche sur la naissance des Jeux floraux le 3 mai 1324. Hérodote.net. 

1323 establishments in Europe
1320s establishments in France
1513 disestablishments in France
French poetry
Organizations based in Toulouse